Insignificance  is a 1985 British alternate history drama film directed by Nicolas Roeg, and starring Gary Busey, Michael Emil, Theresa Russell, Tony Curtis, and Will Sampson. Adapted by Terry Johnson from his 1982 play of the same name, the film follows four famous characters who converge in a New York City hotel one night in 1954: Joe DiMaggio, Albert Einstein, Marilyn Monroe, and Joseph McCarthy—billed as The Ballplayer, The Professor, The Actress and The Senator, respectively.

Plot
On a crowded New York City street, people have gathered to watch a film crew shoot a sequence where The Actress in a white dress is standing on a grate while the rush of wind caused by a huge fan to imitate the subway going by below blows her skirt up around her waist. The Actress's husband, The Ballplayer, watches with obvious discomfort as she is ogled. The Actress, rather than join him afterwards, disappears in a taxi, leaving him behind. She stops at a store and picks up a variety of toys, flashlights, and balloons.

Meanwhile, The Professor is in his hotel room, working on pages of mathematical calculations. He is interrupted by The Senator, who has come to alternately coax and threaten him into appearing before a committee to investigate his activities and answer the famous question, "Are you now or have you ever been...?" The Professor refuses and says he will never appear. The Senator leaves, saying he'll be back to get him at 8 a.m. the following morning.

The Actress appears at the door of the Professor's hotel room, and he invites her in. They talk about fame, being chased, and the stars. She does a lively demonstration of the theory of relativity using the toys and flashlights and balloons. She tells The Professor he is at the top of her list of people she'd like to sleep with. They decide to go to bed, but are interrupted by the arrival of The Ballplayer, who has tracked her to the hotel. The Professor leaves them alone and goes to find another room, meeting a Cherokee elevator man with whom he speaks. The Actress and The Ballplayer talk about their marriage; The Actress tells her husband she believes she is pregnant, but he has fallen asleep.

The following morning The Senator arrives at The Professor's room to find him gone, but The Actress naked and alone in The Professor's bed. He mistakes her for a call girl and threatens to use her to expose and embarrass The Professor, then punches her hard in the abdomen, causing her to collapse in pain. The Professor returns while The Senator is collecting all of the hundreds of pages of The Professor's work to take away with him. The Professor grabs the papers and throws them out of the windows, while The Actress writhes in agony on the bed. The Senator leaves, defeated in his purpose. The Ballplayer returns and talks about his fame in the baseball world, and confides in him about his marital problems while The Actress is in the bathroom, possibly suffering a miscarriage. She finally announces to him that their marriage is over, and he leaves.

The Actress becomes impatient with The Professor, sensing that he is hiding something. He is sitting on the bed with his watch, which has stopped at 8:15, in one hand, and the alarm clock in the other as the hour approaches 8:15 (the time that "Little Boy" was dropped on Hiroshima). He confesses his terrible feelings of guilt about the event, and she reassures him. Right at 8:15 a.m. as she is leaving, he has a vision of the destruction of the room, Hiroshima, and the world. The Actress's skirt swirls in flames as she burns in his vision. Then the film reverses and the world is restored to order as she smiles and leaves.

Cast

Production

Development

Insignificance was originally a play, written by Terry Johnson and performed at the Royal Court Theatre in London in 1982, with Judy Davis as The Actress. The seed for the play was Johnson's having read that an autographed photograph of Einstein was found amongst Marilyn Monroe's possessions upon her death. The idea of their meeting piqued his interest, and he wrote what became a meditation on the nature of fame. "It was always meant to be a play about the era, about fame ... what these people stood for, the fact that this was different from what they are." He was interested in exploring the differences between who these people really were, as opposed to what qualities others assumed or imbued them with. Johnson acknowledges that there are "lots of little cheats" in the play, mostly to do with exactly where and when The Seven Year Itch was filmed, and the timing of Monroe's marriage to Joe DiMaggio. Einstein was also never called to testify before the House Un-American Activities Committee, "but," he said, "had it gone on longer, I can see that as having been a big possibility. He was there in spirit, as it were."

Roeg saw the play and felt it "might be a tool to use. An incident came up in my own life and I thought, 'Good God, nobody knows a damn thing about anyone.' That was the premise that started me thinking about the piece again." Roeg notes that Insignificance is usually talked about as a meeting between Marilyn Monroe and Albert Einstein, but what moved him was the pain of the problems between The Actress and The Ballplayer, who are married but seem to know nothing about each other. Insignificance would become his first film adapted from a play.

Roeg asked Johnson to work on the screenplay, which at first meant simply reducing the play to approximately 90 minutes as opposed to two hours, but then Roeg began making suggestions which would expand the screenplay and include flashbacks to the characters' histories, and flash-forwards of imagination. His suggestions inspired Johnson to focus on a deeper development of the characters, while Roeg himself began to imagine how the film could open the play spatially as well as laterally.  "He opened it backwards," Johnson said.

Filming
All of the interiors for Insignificance as well as the Seven Year Itch scene, were shot at Lee Studios in Wembley Park, England, with second-unit exteriors shot in New York City. Mise-en-scène was created through the use of Pablo Picasso's post-cubism painting Woman and Child on the Seashore which underscores The Actress' pain about her childlessness, while the fractured structure of the narrative was mirrored in the splintered image of Theresa Russell used as a nude calendar shot of The Actress. Created by photographer-collagist David Hockney, the image is, according to film critic Chuck Stephens, "a pinup in a hundred pieces, a centerfold sent through a centrifuge..." and is a reflection of The Actress. With "her much-exposed and famously exploited psyche already splintered into jagged, mingled shards of kittenish innocence, movie business cunning, overwhelming erotic appeal, and abject inner terror, Monroe was post-cubism's quintessential glittering star...perfectly pieced together and seen prismatically all at once..." The image is also a metaphor for Roeg's non-linear filmmaking, Stephens notes that "for a cine-cubist like Roeg, two entirely disparate spatial and temporal dimensions are never more than a splice apart, and in Insignificance, the past is always present, and never goes away."

Soundtrack
The soundtrack to the film, titled The Shape of the Universe, was released in the UK by the British label ZTT Records on 5 August 1985 as ZTT IQ4. It features six tracks performed and produced by Stanley Myers, who is credited in the film for the score. Roy Orbison sings the song "Wild Hearts", written by Orbison and Will Jennings, and Theresa Russell sings "Life Goes On", which is uncredited. Glenn Gregory, Claudia Brucken and Will Jennings perform "When Your Heart Runs Out of Time", written by Jennings, which Jennings also sings by himself on another track.  Composer Hans Zimmer contributed three tracks he performed and produced, and Gil Evans and his orchestra contributed an interpretation of Mozart's Jupiter Symphony.  The record also includes dialogue excerpts from the film.

Critical reception
Insignificance received mostly positive reviews at the time of its release, and currently has a 73% approval rating at Rotten Tomatoes based on 15 reviews, with an average score of 6.4/10. The film has been written about extensively in the years since it was first seen. Film4's movie critic wrote: "Roeg really is the perfect director to bring Johnson's stage play to the screen. Throughout, tortured childhood flashbacks and pessimistic flash-forwards (ka-boom!) draw unexpected connections between time, place and circumstance, with the repeated visual motif of a wristwatch employed to mark time's passing – but perhaps also to suggest all time is one time; each moment co-existing. As evinced by his back catalogue, it's something of a hobbyhorse for a director enchanted with the notion of synchronicity – see Don't Look Now in particular. Here, 1920 bleeds into 1945 and drip-feeds into the 1980s, a period in which another 'Actor' has taken on his greatest role as the President of the United States."

Frederic and Mary Ann Brussat write: "Insignificance shines with some incandescent moments of acting bravado delivered by Theresa Russell, Tony Curtis, and Gary Busey. As a weird meditation on sex, power, knowledge, and fame, this is a four-star treat for those who savor exotic movie fare...Nicolas Roeg (Don't Look Now, The Man Who Fell to Earth) draws out the inner psychological nuances of the drama and delivers the philosophical freight in Terry Johnson's screenplay."

Awards and honors
The film was entered into the 1985 Cannes Film Festival where it was nominated for the Palme d'Or and won the Technical Grand Prize.

Home media
Insignificance was released on VHS in 1985, on Laserdisc a few years later, and on DVD in 2003. In June 2011, The Criterion Collection released a fully restored and re-mastered DVD and Blu-ray edition, containing interviews with Nicolas Roeg, Terry Johnson, long-time Roeg editor Tony Lawson, and the short film, "Making Insignificance". The release also contains a booklet with excerpts from the August 1985 Roeg-Johnson interview called "Relatively Speaking" in the 1985 Monthly Film Bulletin, and an essay by film critic Chuck Stephens.

In popular culture
The film is featured in Big Audio Dynamite's music video for "E=MC2". Clips of the film are shown throughout the video and are referenced throughout the song.

References
j

External links
 
 
 
 McCarthyism and the Movies
 Insignificance: Stargazing an essay by Chuck Stephen at the Criterion Collection
 Interview with Theresa Russell by Sam Wasson

1985 films
1985 comedy-drama films
British alternative history films
British comedy-drama films
British films based on plays
Films about the atomic bombings of Hiroshima and Nagasaki
Films directed by Nicolas Roeg
Films set in 1954
Films set in the 1950s
Films shot in New York City
Cultural depictions of Marilyn Monroe
Cultural depictions of Albert Einstein
Cultural depictions of Joseph McCarthy
Cultural depictions of Joe DiMaggio
Films about McCarthyism
Films scored by Stanley Myers
Films scored by Hans Zimmer
Films produced by Jeremy Thomas
Films à clef
1985 comedy films
1985 drama films
1980s English-language films
1980s British films